An oath is a statement of fact, or a promise as a sign of truth.

Oath may also refer to:

 Oath (horse) (foaled 1996), Thoroughbred race horse
 "Oath" (song), Cher Lloyd and Becky G, 2012
  Oath Inc., a renamed and divested subsidiary of  Verizon
 Oath, a deserted medieval village in the parish of Aller, Somerset, England
 Oath: Chronicles of Empire and Exile, a board game published by Leder Games
 an acronym from the phrase "open authentication" in Initiative for Open Authentication
 Oath of office, an official promise by a person elected to public office to lawfully fulfil its duties

See also

 The Oath (disambiguation)
 Swear (disambiguation)
 Minced oath, a euphemistic expression formed by misspelling, mispronouncing, or replacing a part of a profane, blasphemous, or taboo language
 OAuth, an open standard for access delegation
 Přísaha (Czech, 'Oath'), an extra-parliamentary political party in the Czech Republic